Faye Strutt (born September 25, 1947 in Vancouver, British Columbia) is a Canadian former pair skater.  With partner Jim Watters, she won the bronze medal at the Canadian Figure Skating Championships in 1964 and 1965 and competed at the 1964 Winter Olympics in Innsbruck, Austria.

Results
Mixed pairs, partnered with Jim Watters:

References

1947 births
Canadian female pair skaters
Figure skaters at the 1964 Winter Olympics
Living people
Olympic figure skaters of Canada
Figure skaters from Vancouver